The 1921 Bremen state election was held on 20 February 1921 to elect the 120 members of the Bürgerschaft of Bremen.

Results

References 

1921 elections in Germany
1921